Sierra de la Demanda is a mountain sub-range situated in the northern Iberian Peninsula.

The Sierra de la Demanda area provides the habitat for Lissotriton helveticus punctillatus (Schmidtler 1970), a subspecies of the palmate newt.

Geography

The Sierra de la Demanda is part of the western section of the larger Sistema Ibérico. The sub-range runs through the eastern province of Burgos and western La Rioja, bordering on the Meseta Central in Spain.

Monte San Lorenzo (2270 m), highest peak of the sub-range.
Monte San Millán (2131 m)
The highest peaks of the range are usually covered in snow between October and May every year.  Valdezcaray ski resort is located in the Sierra de la Demanda. The Picos de Urbión are located south of this range.

See also
Valdezcaray
Sierra de la Demanda (comarca),
Geography of Spain
Montes de Oca, eastern shire.
Alarcia, a typical town.
Demandasaurus

References

External links

Sierradelademanda.com

Demanda
Green Spain
Demanda